Alum Rock is an historic community located in Clarion County, Pennsylvania. It is located at 41.1672840 -79.6211593. Its post office operated until 1944. Elevation 1086 ft.

Sources
 U.S. Department of the Interior, U.S. Geological Survey, 1:62,500-scale topographic maps
 Foxburg Survey, 1944
 Alum Rock, Pennsylvania, Geographic Names Information System, U.S. Geological Survey.

Populated places in Clarion County, Pennsylvania